The Fear is a four-part television drama series, created by Richard Cottan, first broadcast on Channel 4 on 3 December 2012. The series, broadcast over four consecutive nights, stars Peter Mullan as Brighton-based criminal kingpin Richie Beckett, who finds himself waging war on an Albanian sex trafficking gang trying to muscle in on his turf, all whilst trying to deal with the onset symptoms of dementia.

The series also stars Harry Lloyd and Paul Nicholls as Richie's children, Matty and Cal, and Anastasia Hille as his wife, Jo. The series averaged an audience of 1.25 million viewers across its four-night run. The series has been released on DVD in Europe, but remains unreleased in the UK.

References

External links

2012 British television series debuts
2012 British television series endings
2010s British crime television series
2010s British drama television series
Channel 4 television dramas
2010s British television miniseries
English-language television shows
Television shows set in England